Marian Anderson (February 27, 1897April 8, 1993) was an American contralto. She performed a wide range of music, from opera to spirituals. Anderson performed with renowned orchestras in major concert and recital venues throughout the United States and Europe between 1925 and 1965.

Anderson was an important figure in the struggle for African-American artists to overcome racial prejudice in the United States during the mid-twentieth century. In 1939 during the era of racial segregation, the Daughters of the American Revolution (DAR) refused to allow Anderson to sing to an integrated audience in Constitution Hall in Washington, D.C. The incident placed Anderson in the spotlight of the international community on a level unusual for a classical musician. With the aid of First Lady Eleanor Roosevelt and her husband President Franklin D. Roosevelt, Anderson performed a critically acclaimed open-air concert on Easter Sunday, April 9, 1939, on the Lincoln Memorial steps in the capital. The event was featured in a documentary film. She sang before an integrated crowd of more than 75,000 people and a radio audience in the millions.

On January 7, 1955, Anderson became the first African-American singer to perform at the Metropolitan Opera. In addition, she worked as a delegate to the United Nations Human Rights Committee and as a Goodwill Ambassador for the United States Department of State, giving concerts all over the world. She participated in the civil rights movement in the 1960s, singing at the March on Washington for Jobs and Freedom in 1963. The recipient of numerous awards and honors, Anderson was awarded the first Presidential Medal of Freedom in 1963, the Congressional Gold Medal in 1977, the Kennedy Center Honors in 1978, the National Medal of Arts in 1986, and a Grammy Lifetime Achievement Award in 1991.

Early life and education
Marian Anderson was born in Philadelphia on February 27, 1897, to John Berkley Anderson (c. 1872–1910) and Annie Delilah Rucker (1874–1964). Her father sold ice and coal at the Reading Terminal in downtown Philadelphia and eventually also sold liquor. Prior to her marriage, Anderson's mother was briefly a student at the Virginia Seminary and College in Lynchburg and had worked as a schoolteacher in Virginia. As she did not obtain a degree, Annie Anderson was unable to teach in Philadelphia under a law that was applied only to black teachers and not white ones. She therefore earned an income caring for small children. Marian was the eldest of the three Anderson children. Her two sisters, Alyse (1899–1965) and Ethel (1902–90), also became singers. Ethel married James DePreist and their son James Anderson DePreist was a noted conductor.

Anderson's parents were both devout Christians and the whole family was active in the Union Baptist Church, which, during her youth, stood in a building constructed by the congregation in 1889 at 709 S. 12th Street in South Philadelphia. Marian's aunt Mary, her father's sister, was particularly active in the church's musical life and convinced her niece to join the junior church choir at the age of six. In that role, she got to perform solos and duets, often with her aunt. Aunt Mary took Marian to concerts at local churches, the YMCA, benefit concerts, and other community music events throughout the city. Anderson credited her aunt's influence as the reason she pursued her singing career. Beginning as young as six, her aunt arranged for Marian to sing for local functions where she was often paid 25 or 50 cents for singing a few songs. As she got into her early teens, Marian began to make as much as four or five dollars for singing, a considerable sum for the early 20th century. At the age of 10, Marian joined the People's Chorus of Philadelphia under the direction of a singer Emma Azalia Hackley, where she was often a soloist.

When Anderson was 12, her father received a head injury while working at the Reading Terminal before Christmas 1909. Soon afterwards her father died, following heart failure. He was 37 years old. Marian and her family moved into the home of her father's parents, Benjamin and Isabella Anderson. Her grandfather had been born a slave and had been emancipated in the 1860s. He relocated to South Philadelphia, the first of his family to do so. When Anderson moved into his home, the two became very close, but he died just a year after the family moved in.

Anderson attended Stanton Grammar School, graduating in 1912. Her family could not pay for any music lessons or high school. Still, Anderson continued to perform wherever she could and learn from anyone who was willing to teach her. Throughout her teenage years, she remained active in her church's musical activities, now heavily involved in the adult choir. She became a member of the Baptists' Young People's Union and the Camp Fire Girls, which provided her with some limited musical opportunities. Eventually, the People's Chorus of Philadelphia and the pastor of her church, Reverend Wesley Parks, along with other leaders of the black community, raised the money she needed to get singing lessons with Mary Saunders Patterson and to attend South Philadelphia High School, from which she graduated in 1921.

After high school, Anderson applied to an all-white music school, the Philadelphia Musical Academy (now University of the Arts School of Music), but was turned away because she was black. The woman working the admissions counter replied, "We don't take colored" when she tried to apply. Undaunted, Anderson pursued studies privately in her native city through the continued support of the Philadelphia black community, first with Agnes Reifsnyder, then Giuseppe Boghetti. She met Boghetti through the principal of her high school. Anderson auditioned for him by singing "Deep River"; he was immediately brought to tears. Boghetti scheduled a recital of English, Russian, Italian and German music at The Town Hall in New York City in April 1924; it took place in an almost empty hall and received poor reviews.

In 1923 she made two recordings, "Deep River" and "My Way's Cloudy" for the Victor company.

Early career
In 1925, Anderson got her first big break at a singing competition sponsored by the New York Philharmonic. As the winner, she got to perform in concert with the orchestra on August 26, 1925, a performance that scored immediate success with both the audience and music critics. Anderson continued her studies with Frank La Forge in New York. During this time, Arthur Judson became her manager. They met through the New York Philharmonic. Over the next several years, she made a number of concert appearances in the United States, but racial prejudice prevented her career from gaining momentum. Her first performance at Carnegie Hall was in 1928.

Rosenwald Fund
During her fall 1929 concert schedule, Anderson sang at Orchestra Hall in Chicago. The performance was greeted with measured praise. Critic Herman Devries from the Chicago Evening American wrote, "[Anderson] reached near perfection in every requirement of vocal art—the tone was of superb timbre, the phrasing of utmost refinement, the style pure, discreet, musicianly. But after this there was a letdown, and we took away the impression of a talent still unripe, but certainly a talent of potential growth." In the audience were two representatives from Julius Rosenwald's philanthropic organization, the Rosenwald Fund. The organization's representatives, Ray Field and George Arthur, encouraged Anderson to apply for a Rosenwald Fellowship, from which she received $1500 to study in Berlin.

European tours
Anderson went to Europe, where she spent a number of months studying with Sara Charles-Cahier, before launching a highly successful European singing tour. In the summer of 1930, she went to Scandinavia, where she met the Finnish pianist Kosti Vehanen, who became her regular accompanist and her vocal coach for many years. She also met Jean Sibelius through Vehanen after he had heard her in a concert in Helsinki. Moved by her performance, Sibelius invited them to his home and asked his wife to bring champagne in place of the traditional coffee. Sibelius complimented Anderson on her performance; he felt that she had been able to penetrate the Nordic soul. The two struck up an immediate friendship, which further blossomed into a professional partnership, and for many years Sibelius altered and composed songs for Anderson. He created a new arrangement of the song "Solitude" and dedicated it to Anderson in 1939. Originally The Jewish Girl's Song from his 1906 incidental music to Belshazzar's Feast, it later became the "Solitude" section of the orchestral suite derived from the incidental music.

In 1933, Anderson made her European debut in a concert at Wigmore Hall in London, where she was received enthusiastically. In the first years of the 1930s, she toured Europe, where she did not encounter the prejudices she had experienced in America. Anderson, accompanied by Vehanen, continued to tour throughout Europe during the mid-1930s. Before going back to Scandinavia, where fans had "Marian fever", she performed in Russia and the major cities of Eastern Europe. She quickly became a favorite of many conductors and composers of major European orchestras. During a 1935 tour in Salzburg, the conductor Arturo Toscanini told her she had a voice "heard once in a hundred years."

American tours 
In 1934, impresario Sol Hurok offered Anderson a better contract than she previously had with Arthur Judson. He became her manager, and he persuaded her to come back and perform in America. In 1935, Anderson made her second recital appearance at The Town Hall, New York City, which received highly favorable reviews from music critics. She spent the next four years touring throughout the United States and Europe. She was offered opera roles by several European houses, but due to her lack of acting experience, Anderson declined all of them. She did, however, record a number of arias in the studio, which became bestsellers.

Anderson's accomplishments as a singer did not make her immune to the Jim Crow laws in the 1930s. Although she gave approximately seventy recitals a year in the United States, Anderson was still turned away by some American hotels and restaurants. Because of this discrimination, Albert Einstein, a champion of racial tolerance, hosted Anderson on many occasions, the first being in 1937 when she was denied a hotel room while performing at Princeton University. Einstein's first hosting of Anderson became the subject of a play, "My Lord, What a Night," in 2021. She last stayed with him months before he died in 1955.

1939 Lincoln Memorial concert

In 1939, Sarah Corbin Robert, head of the Daughters of the American Revolution (DAR) denied permission to Anderson for a concert on April 9 at DAR Constitution Hall under a white performers-only policy in effect at the time. In addition to the policy on performers, Washington, DC, was a segregated city, and Black patrons were upset that they would have to sit at the back of Constitution Hall. Furthermore, Constitution Hall did not have the segregated public bathrooms required by DC law at the time for such events. Other DC venues were not an option: the District of Columbia Board of Education declined a request for the use of the auditorium of a white public high school.

The next day, Charles Edward Russell, a co-founder of the National Association for the Advancement of Colored People (NAACP) and chair of the DC citywide Inter-Racial Committee, held a meeting of the Marian Anderson Citizens Committee (MACC). This included the National Negro Congress, the Brotherhood of Sleeping Car Porters, the American Federation of Labor, and the Washington Industrial Council-CIO, plus church leaders and activists in the city and numerous other organizations. MACC elected Charles Hamilton Houston as its chairman and on February 20, the group picketed the Board of Education, collected signatures on petitions, and planned a mass protest at the next board meeting.

In the ensuing furor, thousands of DAR members, including First Lady Eleanor Roosevelt, resigned from the organization. Roosevelt wrote to the DAR: "I am in complete disagreement with the attitude taken in refusing Constitution Hall to a great artist... You had an opportunity to lead in an enlightened way and it seems to me that your organization has failed." Author Zora Neale Hurston criticized Eleanor Roosevelt's public silence about the similar decision by the District of Columbia Board of Education.

As the controversy grew, the American press overwhelmingly supported Anderson's right to sing. The Philadelphia Tribune wrote, "A group of tottering old ladies, who don't know the difference between patriotism and putridism, have compelled the gracious First Lady to apologize for their national rudeness." The Richmond Times-Dispatch wrote, "In these days of racial intolerance so crudely expressed in the Third Reich, an action such as the D.A.R.’s ban... seems all the more deplorable."

At Eleanor Roosevelt's instigation, President Roosevelt and Walter White, then-executive secretary of the NAACP, and Anderson's manager, Sol Hurok, persuaded Secretary of the Interior Harold L. Ickes to arrange an open-air concert on the steps of the Lincoln Memorial. The concert was performed on Easter Sunday, April 9. Anderson was accompanied, as usual, by Vehanen. They began the performance with a dignified and stirring rendition of "My Country, 'Tis of Thee." The event attracted a crowd of more than 75,000 in addition to a national radio audience of millions.

Two months later, in conjunction with the 30th NAACP conference in Richmond, Virginia, Eleanor Roosevelt gave a speech on national radio (NBC and CBS) and presented Anderson with the 1939 Spingarn Medal for distinguished achievement. In 2001, a documentary film of the concert was chosen for the National Film Registry, and in 2008, NBC radio coverage of the event was selected for the National Recording Registry.

Mid-career

During World War II and the Korean War, Anderson entertained troops in hospitals and at bases. In 1943, she sang at the Constitution Hall, having been invited by the DAR to perform before an integrated audience as part of a benefit for the American Red Cross. She said of the event, "When I finally walked onto the stage of Constitution Hall, I felt no different than I had in other halls. There was no sense of triumph. I felt that it was a beautiful concert hall and I was very happy to sing there." In contrast, the District of Columbia Board of Education continued to bar her from using the high school auditorium in the District of Columbia.

Ford 50th Anniversary Show 
On June 15, 1953, Anderson headlined The Ford 50th Anniversary Show, which was broadcast live from New York City on both NBC and CBS. Midway through the program, she sang "He's Got the Whole World in His Hands." She returned to close the program with her rendition of the "Battle Hymn of the Republic." The program attracted an audience of 60 million viewers. Forty years after the broadcast, television critic Tom Shales recalled the broadcast as both "a landmark in television" and "a milestone in the cultural life of the '50s".

The Metropolitan Opera 
On January 7, 1955, Anderson became the first African-American to sing with the Metropolitan Opera in New York. At the invitation of director Rudolf Bing, she sang the part of Ulrica in Giuseppe Verdi's Un ballo in maschera (opposite Zinka Milanov, then Herva Nelli, as Amelia). Anderson later said about the evening, "The curtain rose on the second scene and I was there on stage, mixing the witch's brew. I trembled, and when the audience applauded and applauded before I could sing a note, I felt myself tightening into a knot." Although she never appeared with the company again, Anderson was named a permanent member of the Metropolitan Opera company. The following year, her autobiography, My Lord, What a Morning, was published, and became a bestseller.

Presidential inaugurations and goodwill ambassador tours 
In 1957, she sang for President Dwight D. Eisenhower's inauguration, and toured India and the Far East as a goodwill ambassador through the U.S. State Department and the American National Theater and Academy. She traveled  in 12 weeks, giving 24 concerts. After that, President Eisenhower appointed her a delegate to the United Nations Human Rights Committee. The same year, she was elected Fellow of the American Academy of Arts and Sciences. In 1958, she was officially designated a delegate to the United Nations, a formalization of her role as "goodwill ambassadress" of the U.S.

On January 20, 1961, she sang for President John F. Kennedy's inauguration, and in 1962 she performed for President Kennedy and other dignitaries in the East Room of the White House and toured Australia. She was active in supporting the civil rights movement during the 1960s. She performed benefit concerts in aid of the America-Israel Cultural Foundation, the National Association for the Advancement of Colored People and the Congress of Racial Equality. In 1963, she sang at the March on Washington for Jobs and Freedom. That same year, she received one of the newly reinstituted Presidential Medal of Freedom, which is awarded for "especially meritorious contributions to the security or national interest of the United States, World Peace or cultural or other significant public or private endeavors." She also released an album, Snoopycat: The Adventures of Marian Anderson's Cat Snoopy, which included short stories and songs about her beloved black cat. That same year, Anderson concluded her farewell tour, after which she retired from public performance. The international tour began at Constitution Hall on Saturday October 24, 1964, and ended on April 18, 1965, at Carnegie Hall. In 1965, she christened the nuclear-powered ballistic-missile submarine .

Later life

Although Anderson retired from singing in 1965, she continued to appear publicly. She often narrated Aaron Copland's Lincoln Portrait, with her nephew James DePriest conducting. In 1976, Copland conducted a performance with the Philadelphia Orchestra at Saratoga. Her achievements were recognized with many honors, including the University of Pennsylvania Glee Club Award of Merit in 1973; the United Nations Peace Prize, New York City's Handel Medallion, and the Congressional Gold Medal, all in 1977; Kennedy Center Honors in 1978; the George Peabody Medal in 1981; the National Medal of Arts in 1986; and a Grammy Award for Lifetime Achievement in 1991. A half-ounce gold commemorative medal was embossed with her portrait by the United States Treasury Department in 1980. Four years later, she was the first person to be honored with the Eleanor Roosevelt Human Rights Award of the City of New York. She was awarded 24 honorary doctoral degrees, by Howard University, Temple University, Smith College and many other colleges and universities.

Personal life
On July 17, 1943, Anderson became the second wife of architect Orpheus H. "King" Fisher (1900–1986) in Bethel, Connecticut. Fisher had asked her to marry him when they were teenagers, but she declined at that time because she feared it would have forestalled her music career. The wedding was a private ceremony performed by United Methodist pastor Rev. Jack Grenfell and was the subject of a short story titled "The 'Inside' Story," written by Rev. Grenfell's wife, Dr. Clarine Coffin Grenfell, in her book Women My Husband Married, including Marian Anderson. According to Dr. Grenfell, the wedding was originally supposed to take place in the parsonage, but because of a bake sale on the lawn of the Bethel United Methodist Church, the ceremony was moved at the last minute to the Elmwood Chapel, on the site of the Elmwood Cemetery in Bethel, in order to keep the event private.

By this marriage she gained a stepson, James Fisher, from her husband's previous marriage to Ida Gould, a white woman.

In 1940, seeking a retreat away from the public eye, Anderson and Fisher purchased a three-story Victorian farmhouse on a  farm in Danbury, Connecticut, after an exhaustive search throughout New York, New Jersey, and Connecticut. Through the years, he built many structures on the property, including an acoustic rehearsal studio he designed for his wife. The property remained Anderson's home for almost 50 years.

From 1943, she resided at the farm that Orpheus had named Marianna Farm. The farm was on Joe's Hill Road, in the Mill Plain section of western Danbury. She constructed a three-bedroom ranch house as a residence, and she used a separate one-room structure as her studio. In 1996, the farm was named one of 60 sites on the Connecticut Freedom Trail. The studio was moved to downtown Danbury as the Marian Anderson studio.

As a town resident, Anderson wished to live as normally as possible, declining offers to be treated in restaurants and stores as a celebrity. She was known to visit the Danbury State Fair. She sang at the city hall on the occasion of the lighting of Christmas ornaments. She gave a concert at the Danbury High School. She served on the board of the Danbury Music Center and supported the Charles Ives Center for the Arts and the Danbury Chapter of the NAACP.

In 1986, Orpheus Fisher died after 43 years of marriage. Anderson remained in residence at Marianna Farm until 1992, one year before her death. Although the property was sold to developers, various preservationists as well as the City of Danbury fought to protect Anderson's studio. Their efforts proved successful, and the Danbury Museum and Historical Society received a grant from the state of Connecticut, relocated and restored the structure, and opened it to the public in 2004. In addition to seeing the studio, visitors can see photographs and memorabilia from milestones in Anderson's career.

In 1992, Anderson relocated to the home of her nephew, conductor James DePreist, in Portland, Oregon. She died there on April 8, 1993, of congestive heart failure, at the age of 96. She is interred at Eden Cemetery, in Collingdale, Pennsylvania.

Awards and honors

 1939: NAACP Spingarn Medal
 1963: Presidential Medal of Freedom
 1973: University of Pennsylvania Glee Club Award of Merit
 1973: National Women's Hall of Fame
 1977: United Nations Peace Prize
 1977: New York City – Handel Medallion
 1977: Congressional Gold Medal
 1978: Kennedy Center Honors
 1980: United States Treasury Department gold commemorative medal
 1984: Eleanor Roosevelt Human Rights Award of the City of New York
 1986: National Medal of Arts
 1991: Grammy Lifetime Achievement Award
 Honorary doctorate from Howard University, Temple University, Smith College

Legacy

The life and art of Anderson has been commemorated by writers, artists, and city, state, and national organizations. The following is a selected list:

 She was an example and an inspiration to both Leontyne Price and Jessye Norman.
 1948: The anthology radio drama Destination Freedom recapped her earlier life in the episode "Choir Girl from Philadelphia".
 1976: Among the historical figures featured in the artwork Our Nation's 200th Birthday, The Telephone's 100th Birthday by Stanley Meltzoff for Bell System.
 1999: A one-act musical play entitled My Lord, What a Morning: The Marian Anderson Story was produced by the Kennedy Center. The musical took its title from Anderson's memoir, published by Viking in 1956.
 2001: The 1939 documentary film, Marian Anderson: The Lincoln Memorial Concert was selected for preservation in the United States National Film Registry by the Library of Congress as being "culturally, historically, or aesthetically significant."
 2002: Molefi Kete Asante included Anderson in his book,100 Greatest African Americans.
 2005: U.S. postage stamp honored Anderson as part of the Black Heritage series. Anderson is also pictured on the US$5,000 Series I United States Savings Bond.
 2008: A BBC Radio 4 documentary, Freedom Song produced by Ekene Akalawu, was first broadcast on January 24, 2008.
 2011: The Marian Anderson House, in Philadelphia, was added to the National Register of Historic Places.
 2016: The Union Baptist Church (Built 1915–16), 1910 Fitzwater Street, Philadelphia, PA, was added to the Philadelphia Register of Historic Places, under Criteria A and J, the former being for its association with Marian Anderson, providing regulatory protection to the building from alteration and demolition.
 2016: Jack Lew announced that Anderson would appear along with Eleanor Roosevelt and Martin Luther King Jr. on the back of the redesigned US$5 bill scheduled to be unveiled in the year 2020, the 100th anniversary of 19th Amendment of the Constitution that granted women in America the right to vote.
 2021: Anderson's life and the 1939 Constitution Hall controversy and her subsequent concert at the Lincoln Memorial were the subject of a documentary, Voice of Freedom, that aired as an episode of American Experience on PBS.

Marian Anderson Award
The Marian Anderson Award was established in 1943 by Anderson after she was awarded the $25,000 from The Philadelphia Award in 1940 by the city of Philadelphia. Anderson used the award money to establish a singing competition to help support young singers. The prize fund was exhausted in due course and disbanded in 1976. In 1990, the award was re-established and has dispensed $25,000 annually. In 1998, the Marian Anderson Award prize money was restructured to be given to an established artist, not necessarily a singer, who exhibits leadership in a humanitarian area.

See also 

 List of African-American firsts
 List of rallies and protest marches in Washington, D.C.
 Marian Anderson House

References

Sources

Bibliography 
 Arsenault, Raymond, The Sound of Freedom: Marian Anderson, the Lincoln Memorial, and the concert that awakened America. Bloomsbury Publishing, 2009). 
 Freedman, Russell, The Voice that Challenged a Nation: Marian Anderson and the Struggle For Equal Rights. New York: Clarion Books, 2004. 
 Sims-Wood, Janet L, Marian Anderson, An Annotated Bibliography and Discography. Connecticut: Greenwood Press, 1981. 
 
 
  Forgotten Books, 2018, .

Biographical entries 
 Hamilton, David. (1987). The Metropolitan Opera Encyclopedia: A Comprehensive Guide to the World of Opera. New York, London, Toronto, Sydney, Tokyo: Simon and Schuster, p. 22. .
 Hamilton, Mary. (1990). A–Z of Opera. New York, Oxford, Sydney: Facts On File, p. 17. .
 Rosenthal, Harold and John Warrack (1979, 2nd ed.). The Concise Oxford Dictionary of Opera. London, New York and Melbourne: Oxford University Press, p. 11. .
 Sadie, Stanley and Christina Bashford. (1992). The New Grove Dictionary of Opera. London: Macmillan Publishers Ltd. Vol. 1, p. 123. .
 Sadie, Stanley and John Tyrrell. (2001).The New Grove Dictionary of Music and Musicians. London: Macmillan Publishers Ltd. Vol. 1, p. 615. .
 Warrack, John and Ewan West (1996 3rd ed.). The Concise Oxford Dictionary of Opera. New York: Oxford University Press, p. 13. .
 Kennedy Center, "Biography of Marian Anderson"
 Virtual Museum of History, "Marian Anderson"
 FemBio, "Marian Anderson"
 Carlton Higginbotham, "Biography of Marian Anderson"

Selected discography 
 
 
 Marian Anderson on Discography of American Historical Recordings
 Marian Anderson: Biography and Bach Cantatas Recordings on Bach Cantatas

External links 

 Marian Anderson Historical Society
 The singer's former practice studio, now the Marian Anderson Studio, relocated to the Danbury Museum and Historical Society
 Metropolitan Opera performances (MetOpera database)
 
 PBS American Masters "Marian Anderson: The Whole World in Her Hands"
 Marian Anderson Papers in the Sophia Smith Collection, Smith College Special Collection
 University of Pennsylvania exhibitions and collections:
 Online exhibition at the University of Pennsylvania Library, largest online collection of images, includes Anderson's papers, audio and film archives.
 Marian Anderson papers, supplementary records, Kislak Center for Special Collections, Rare Books and Manuscripts, University of Pennsylvania
 Diaries and Notebooks of Marian Anderson, From the Page, University of Pennsylvania
 Marian Anderson, FBI file
 
 Voice of America segment on Marian Anderson (click on mp3 link)

South Philadelphia High School alumni
20th-century African-American women singers
20th-century American women opera singers
African-American women opera singers
American contraltos
1897 births
1993 deaths
Burials at Eden Cemetery (Collingdale, Pennsylvania)
Congressional Gold Medal recipients
Fellows of the American Academy of Arts and Sciences
Grammy Lifetime Achievement Award winners
Kennedy Center honorees
Litteris et Artibus recipients
Presidential Medal of Freedom recipients
George Peabody Medal winners
Spingarn Medal winners
Musicians from Philadelphia
Singers from Pennsylvania
Classical musicians from Pennsylvania
RCA Records artists
EMI Classics and Virgin Classics artists
Victor Records artists